Sønderborg County is a former province in Denmark, located on the island of Als and the easternmost part of Southern Jutland. Sønderborg County was established in 1920 following the reunification of Denmark and South Jutland following the Schleswig Plebiscites. It was dissolved in 1970 when it merged with three other counties to form South Jutland County. Sønderborg County corresponded geographically to the former Prussian .

After Denmark surrendered control over Schleswig to Prussia and the Austrian Empire in 1864, the Schleswig island of Ærø was transferred from Augustenborg County to Svendborg County and the island remained Danish. The rest of Augustenborg County was merged with Sønderborg and became Kreis Sonderburg. Sønderborg County and Aabenraa County merged in 1932, forming Aabenraa-Sønderborg County.

1970 administrative reform
Aabenraa-Sønderborg County was dissolved in the 1970 administrative reform and the former county became six new municipalities belonging to South Jutland County:
Augustenborg
Broager
Nordborg
Sundeved
Sydals
Sønderborg

List of former hundreds
Als Nørre Herred
Als Sønder Herred
Nybøl Herred

See also
 Sønderborg Municipality

This article incorporates material from the corresponding article on the Danish Wikipedia, accessed 30 April 2007.

Counties of Denmark dissolved in 1970